Afā (also known as Toikia) is an aitu or supernatural being in the Polynesian mythology of Tokelau.

References

Polynesian mythology